High Life is an album by jazz saxophonist Wayne Shorter that was released on Verve Records in 1995.
This album won the Grammy Award in 1996 for Best Contemporary Jazz Performance. Some of the musicians include keyboardist Rachel Z, guitarist David Gilmore, bassist Marcus Miller, percussionists Lenny Castro and Airto and drummer Will Calhoun of Living Colour.

Overview 
The album was the first album Wayne Shorter had recorded as a leader for seven years.  It was also his recording debut for Verve Records. High Life was something of a departure from the jazz-fusion albums that Shorter had recorded in the late 1980s after leaving Weather Report. The compositions were generally seen to be more complex than his previous efforts and the use of synthesized instruments was seen to be more subtle.

Shorter wrote, composed, and arranged all of the compositions featured on it. A thirty-piece orchestral ensemble was used in addition to the electronic instruments. The album was produced by Marcus Miller, who also played electric bass and conducted the orchestra. Keyboardist Rachel Z contributed to the orchestration and the sound design of the album as well as played piano and synths. Besides soprano and tenor saxophone it is the first and only (recorded) occasion Shorter played alto and baritone saxophones.

The album was (mainly) recorded and mixed in Bill Schnee's studio in North Hollywood, and released on October 17, 1995. High Life won the Best Contemporary Jazz Performance in 1996.

Track listing 
"Children of the Night" – 7:23
"At the Fair" – 7:29
"Maya" – 5:12
"On the Milky Way Express" – 5:35
"Pandora Awakened" – 6:20
"Virgo Rising" – 6:46
"High Life" – 6:28
"Midnight in Carlotta's Hair" – 5:54
"Black Swan (In Memory of Susan Portlynn Romeo)" – 2:04
All compositions by Wayne Shorter

Personnel 
 Wayne Shorter – alto saxophone, baritone saxophone, soprano saxophone, tenor saxophone 
 Rachel Z – pianos, synthesizers, sequencing, sound design
 David Gilmore – guitars
 Marcus Miller – bass guitar, rhythm programming, bass clarinet
 Will Calhoun – drums
 Terri Lyne Carrington – drums (track 8)
 Lenny Castro – percussion
 Airto Moreira – percussion
 Munyungo Jackson – percussion (track 8)
 Kevin Ricard – percussion (track 8)
 David Ward – additional sound design

Orchestra
 Wayne Shorter – orchestrations and arrangements 
 Marcus Miller – conductor 
 Suzie Katayama – contractor 
 Sarah Bonebrake, Stephen Cartotto, Jim Cowger, Michelle Dalton, Ronald Goldstein, Janice Hayen and Frank Macchia – music copyists

 Horns and Woodwinds
 Gary Bovyer and Lorin Leeve – bass clarinet 
 Ronald Jannelli – bassoon
 Emily Bernstein and Ralph Willliams – clarinet
 Julie Feves and Michele Grego – contrabassoon
 Annarenee Grizell, Kazue McGregor and Sara Weisz – flute
 Joyce Kelley-Clark – oboe
 Linda Muggeridge and Leslie Reed – English horn
 Daniel Kelley, Joe Meyer and Brad Warnaar – French horn
 Steven Holtman and Robert Payne – trombone 
 Jon Lewis and Rob McGregor – trumpet 

 Strings
 Larry Corbett – cello
 Robert Becker, Denyse Buffum, Ralph Fielding, Harry Shirinian and Evan Wilson – viola 
 Bruce Dukov, Armen Garabedian, Suzie Katayama, Edith Markman, Sid Page and Michele Richards – violin

Production
 Marcus Miller – producer 
 John Hendrickson – recording 
 Will Alexander – additional recording 
 Ray Blair – additional recording 
 Peter Doell – additional recording 
 Leslie Ann Jones – additional recording 
 Brian Schueble – additional recording 
 David Ward – additional recording, production assistant 
 Koji Egawa – assistant engineer 
 Steve Genewick – assistant engineer
 Sean Schimmel – assistant engineer
 Brian Young – assistant engineer
 Bill Schnee – mixing 
 Doug Sax – mastering  
 Bibi Green – production coordinator 
 Nate Herr – release coordinator
 Rudi Mallasch – release coordination assistant 
 Erica Gebhardt – logistics coordinator 
 David Lau – art direction, design 
 Chris Cuffaro – photography 
 Ana Maria Shorter – wardrobe 
 Lynne Bugai – stylist
 M'Jai Jefferson – grooming 
 Trish Gossett – make-up
 Roger Cramer – management 

Studios
 Recorded and Mixed at Schnee Studios (Hollywood, California).
 Additional recording at Capitol Studios (Hollywood, California); Pacifique Studios (North Hollywood, California); Milky Way Technics (Los Angeles, California).
 Mastered at The Mastering Lab (Hollywood, California).

References

External links 
 Wayne Shorter - High Life (1995) album releases & credits at Discogs
 Wayne Shorter - High Life (1995) album to be listened on Spotify
 Wayne Shorter - High Life (1995) album to be listened on YouTube
 Official Site from Verve Records.

1995 albums
Verve Records albums
Albums produced by Marcus Miller
Wayne Shorter albums
Grammy Award for Best Contemporary Jazz Album